Ghost-Walker is a science fiction novel by American writerBarbara Hambly, part of the Star Trek: The Original Series saga.

Plot
Elcidar Beta III, inhabited by the Midgwins, is a planet strategically located between the Federation and the Klingon empire. The Midgwins' refusal to embrace technological advances have left their planet devastated and their people endangered. The U.S.S. Enterprise tries to help but is hampered by a murderous force that roams its corridors seemingly at will.

References

External links 

Novels based on Star Trek: The Original Series
1991 American novels
American science fiction novels
Novels by Barbara Hambly